North Carolina's 82nd House district is one of 120 districts in the North Carolina House of Representatives. It has been represented by Republican Kristin Baker since 2020.

Geography
Since 2005, the district has included part of Cabarrus County. The district overlaps with the 34th Senate district.

District officeholders

Election results

2022

2020

2018

2016

2014

2012

2010

2008

2006

2004

2002

2000

References

North Carolina House districts
Cabarrus County, North Carolina